Emily Peters Kagan (born July 14, 1981) is an American mixed martial artist who last fought in the Strawweight division for the Ultimate Fighting Championship. She has also fought for Invicta FC.

Mixed martial arts career

Early life and career
Kagan graduated from Goucher College with a degree in business management and began her amateur MMA career in March 2010, recording five wins and two losses. Kagan made her professional MMA debut in September 2012.  She competed twice that year, winning both fights by decision.

Invicta Fighting Championships
In 2013, Kagan signed with the Invicta FC promotion.  She made her debut on January 5, 2013 at Invicta FC 4.  She lost to Rose Namajunas by submission in the third round.  Kagan rebounded in her second fight for the promotion at Invicta FC 6 on July 13, 2013.  She defeated Ashley Cummins by split decision.

Ultimate Fighting Championship

The Ultimate Fighter
On December 11, 2013, it was announced that Kagan was signed by the UFC along with ten other strawweight fighters to compete on The Ultimate Fighter: A Champion Will Be Crowned, which will crown the first ever UFC strawweight champion.

In the first episode, it was revealed that the UFC had seeded the fighters. Kagan was seeded 15th of 16 fighters and was paired with the no. 2 seed, Joanne Calderwood.  Calderwood was picked third by Team Pettis, thereby sending Kagan to Team Melendez.  In their fight, she lost the bout via majority decision.

After TUF
Kagan's first fight after The Ultimate Fighter was against Angela Hill at The Ultimate Fighter: A Champion Will Be Crowned Finale on December 12, 2014. She lost the fight by unanimous decision. Kagan last fought Kailin Curran at UFC Fight Night: Namajunas vs. VanZant in Las Vegas losing by submission. In April 2016 Kagan was officially dropped from the UFC roster.

Mixed martial arts record

|-
|Loss
|align=center|3–3
|Kailin Curran
|Submission (rear-naked choke)
|UFC Fight Night: Namajunas vs. VanZant
|
|align=center|2
|align=center|4:13
|Las Vegas, Nevada, United States
|
|-
|Loss
|align=center|3–2
|Angela Hill
|Decision (unanimous)
|The Ultimate Fighter: A Champion Will Be Crowned Finale
|
|align=center|3
|align=center|5:00
|Las Vegas, Nevada, United States
|
|-
|Win
| style="text-align:center;"|3–1
|Ashley Cummins
|Decision (split)
|Invicta FC 6: Coenen vs. Cyborg
|
| style="text-align:center;"| 3
| style="text-align:center;"| 5:00
|Kansas City, Missouri, United States
|
|-
|Loss
| style="text-align:center;"|2–1
|Rose Namajunas
|Submission (rear-naked choke)
|Invicta FC 4: Esparza vs. Hyatt
|
| style="text-align:center;"| 3
| style="text-align:center;"| 3:44
|Kansas City, Kansas, United States
|
|-
|Win
| style="text-align:center;"|2–0
|Glena Avila
|Decision (split)
|Dakota FC 13: Coming Home
|
| style="text-align:center;"| 3
| style="text-align:center;"| 5:00
|Grand Forks, North Dakota, United States
|
|-
|Win
| style="text-align:center;"|1–0
|Lynae Lovato
|Decision (unanimous)
|Jackson's MMA Series 9
|
| style="text-align:center;"| 3
| style="text-align:center;"| 5:00
|Albuquerque, New Mexico, United States
|
|}

See also
List of select Jewish mixed martial artists

References

External links
 
 
 

1981 births
Living people
American female mixed martial artists
American jujutsuka
Strawweight mixed martial artists
Mixed martial artists utilizing jujutsu
Goucher College alumni
Jewish American sportspeople
Mixed martial artists from Maine
Sportspeople from Albuquerque, New Mexico
21st-century American Jews
21st-century American women
Ultimate Fighting Championship female fighters